"In the Air" is a song by New Zealand band L.A.B., released as a single from their album L.A.B. III in November 2019. The song topped the charts in New Zealand, becoming the most successful single of 2020 in the country.

Composition

"In the Air" was recorded in 2019 in Wellington, at the home studio of musician Lee Prebble. The band collaborative wrote "In the Air", with member Brad Kora providing the song's lyrics. The song is a melodic pop song, featuring smooth guitars and guest vocals by New Zealand singer Lisa Tomlins.

Release

"In the Air" was released as a single on 22 November 2019, a week before their album L.A.B. III. "In the Air" grew in popularity in New Zealand through 2020, reaching number one in March 2020; it was the first time an independently released single reached number one in New Zealand since Flight of the Conchords' "Feel Inside (And Stuff Like That)" (2012). The song became the best-selling single of 2020 in New Zealand.

A remix EP was released for the song in May 2020, which includes remixes by musicians including Dub FX, whom the band met while touring with Fat Freddy’s Drop in summer 2019/2020, and Tiki Taane, a long-time friend of the bandmembers.

Critical reception

Matthew McAuley of The Spinoff described "In the Air" as "perfectly pitched summer song...sea-scented, very-lightly reggae-tinged groover", likening it to local acts such as the Black Seeds and Breaks Co-Op, as well as the Doobie Brothers' "What a Fool Believes" (1979). At the 2020 Aotearoa Music Awards, the song was nominated for the Aotearoa Music Award for Single of the Year, losing to "Supalonely" by Benee.

Track listing
Digital download and streaming
 "In the Air" – 4:12
 "In the Air" (Dub FX remix) – 3:42
 "In the Air" (Tiki Taane in the Dub remix) – 4:10
 "In the Air" (Scott Tindale remix) – 5:11
 "In the Air" (Magik J remix) – 5:33

Credits and personnel

Ara Adams-Tamatea – bass
Miharo Gregory – keys 
L.A.B. – arrangement, songwriting
Brad Kora – arrangement, drums, lyrics, producer
Stuart Kora – rhythm guitar
Joel Shadbolt – lead guitar, lead vocals
Lisa Tomlins – backing vocals

Charts

Weekly charts

Year-end charts

Certifications

References

2019 singles
2019 songs
L.A.B. songs
Number-one singles in New Zealand